Ilma Julieta Urrutia Chang (born c. 1962) is a Guatemalan model and beauty queen who was the Guatemala's national representative for the major beauty pageants in 1984.

Ilma competed in Miss Universe 1984 in Miami, Florida, where she placed as a semi-finalist. Later on in the year, she joined Miss International in Yokohama, Japan, where she brought home Guatemala's first major beauty pageant title as Miss International 1984.

References

1960s births
Guatemalan beauty pageant winners
Guatemalan people of Basque descent
People from Jutiapa Department
Living people
Miss Guatemala winners
Miss International winners
Miss International 1984 delegates
Miss Universe 1984 contestants